This is a map and list of European countries by budget revenues per capita. The data is from the CIA Factbook, with numbers from 2007 in US$.

Map 

Countries in blue have more than US$10,000 per capita, countries in green are between $3,000 and $10,000 and countries in yellow are below $3,000 budget revenue per capita.

List

See also
International organisations in Europe 
List of European countries by budget revenues
List of European countries by GDP (nominal) per capita
List of European countries by GDP (PPP) per capita 
List of European countries by GNI (nominal) per capita 
List of European countries by GNI (PPP) per capita 
List of countries by GDP (nominal) per capita
List of countries by GDP (PPP) per capita
List of countries by GDP (nominal)
List of countries by GDP (PPP)
List of countries by budget revenues per capita

References

Budget revenues
Europe budget revenues
Europe Budget revenues
Budget revenues per capita